Panchav(a)da is a village and former non-salute Rajput princely state on Saurashtra peninsula in Gujarat, western India.

History 
The petty princely state, in Gohelwar prant, was ruled by Survaiya Rajput Chieftains. In 1901 it comprised a single village, with a population of 287, yielding 1,700 Rupees state revenue (1903-4, mostly from land), paying 241 Rupees tribute, to the Gaikwar Baroda State and Junagadh State.

References

Sources and external links 
History
 Imperial Gazetteer, on DSAL.UChicago.edu - Kathiawar

Princely states of Gujarat
Rajput princely states